Schielands Hoge Zeedijk, formerly called Hoogendijk ("high dike") is a Dutch dike in the province of South Holland that stretches from the Schie at Schiedam to the Gouwe near Gouda. Constructed in the 13th century, the dike continues to protect an area inhabited by 3 million people from flooding by the North Sea.

History

Schielands Hoge Zeedijk was constructed in the 13th century by order of Adelaide of Holland, a noblewoman who was regent of Holland while her nephew, Floris V, Count of Holland, was a minor.

The Schielands Hoge Zeedijk never really collapsed, though the All Saints' Flood of 1570 indicated its weakness. In 1574 it was deliberately cut through in sixteen places during the Siege of Leiden. On 1 February 1953, during the North Sea Flood of 1953, the dike almost collapsed between Capelle aan den IJssel and Nieuwerkerk aan den IJssel; the hole was filled by sailing a ship into the dike, an event commemorated by the monument Dubbeltje op zijn kant ("dime on its edge", a Dutch proverb indicating a dramatic event nearly happened).

Current structure

The Hoogendijk starts in Schiedam and routes via the city of Rotterdam towards the Oosthaven of the city of Gouda. It follows basically the Northern bank of the rivers Nieuwe Maas and the Hollandse IJssel. Nowadays the dike ends at the Julianasluis near Gouda; from 1856 till 1936 the dike ended at an upstream lock called Waaiersluis. The old name of the dike is De Hoogendijk or De Hooge(n) Zeedijk (The High Sea Dike). The Hoogendijk is maintained by 'the Hoogheemraadschap van Schieland en de Krimpenerwaard' and classified as a primary waterbarrier. The total length of the dike is 27 kilometres.

Schiedam
Rotterdamsedijk

Rotterdam
Rotterdamsedijk (officially: Schiedamseweg) · Mathenesserdijk · Havenstraat · Westzeedijk (tot Parksluizen oorspronkelijk tracé zuidkant Heiman Dullaertplein · Pieter de Hoochstraat) · Vasteland · Schiedamsedijk · Korte Hoogstraat · Hoogstraat · Oostzeedijk · Honingerdijk · Nesserdijk · Schaardijk

Capelle aan den IJssel
IJsseldijk/Nijverheidsstraat · Ketensedijk · Dorpsstraat · Groenedijk

Zuidplas
Groenendijk · Kortenoord · Schielandse Hoge Zeedijk-West · Westeinde · Dorpsstraat · Oosteinde · Schielandse Hoge Zeedijk-Oost

Gouda
Sluisdijk · Schielands Hoge Zeedijk

References

Dikes in the Netherlands
Buildings and structures in South Holland